The Victoria Cross: For Valour is a 2003 BBC television historical documentary presented by Jeremy Clarkson. Clarkson examines the history of the Victoria Cross, and follows the story of one of the 1,358 men who were awarded it: Major Robert Henry Cain. The main part of the programme was to describe how in September 1944, Major Cain won what was described as the "finest Victoria Cross of the whole war" by his commanding officer Lt Col Derek McNally. At the end of the programme, Clarkson reveals that Cain was his father-in-law; his then-wife, Frances Cain, had no idea her father was a VC recipient until after his death in 1974.

Clarkson also reveals the history of the medal itself and how it is, and always has been, manufactured by the small London jeweller Hancocks & Co. The bronze itself is from the melted-down breeches of a Chinese-made cannon captured from the Russians during the Siege of Sevastopol in the Crimean War. The remaining lump contains only enough metal to create around 80 additional VCs. It is locked away in a safe in a military storage depot in MoD Donnington near Telford.

External links
 
 

BBC television documentaries about history during the 18th and 19th centuries
2003 television films
2003 films
Victoria Cross
BBC television documentaries about history during the 20th Century
2000s British films